André Marchand (26 May 1926 – 11 January 2011) was a politician of the Quebec Liberal Party.  He was a member of the National Assembly representing the Laurier riding from 1970 to 1981, having defeated the former Liberal René Lévesque in the 1970 election), and was re-elected for the 29th, 30th and 31st National Assembly of Quebec.

Electoral record

References

Quebec Liberal Party MNAs
1926 births
2011 deaths